Emen may refer to:

 Emen, Bulgaria, a village in Bulgaria
 Emen, Bor, a village in Turkey
 Emen Island, an island in Antarctica

See also 
 Emmen (disambiguation)